Rebecca "Becky" Kellar (born January 1, 1975) is a women's ice hockey player. She played for Burlington Barracudas in the Canadian Women's Hockey League.

Kellar played defence for the Canadian women's team at the 2006 Winter Olympics in Turin. She also participated in the 1998 Winter Olympics in Nagano as well as the 2002 Winter Olympics in Salt Lake City. She was named to the Canadian team for the 2010 Winter Olympics and was one of four Canadian women to participate in all four Olympic tournaments along with Hayley Wickenheiser, Jennifer Botterill and Jayna Hefford. Kellar was the oldest player in the 2010 gold medal game. She was the first player on the Canadian national women's hockey team to have children.

Playing career
Kellar was born in Hagersville, Ontario, and played ringette as a child, before switching over to hockey. She competed for Team Ontario at the National Under 18 Championships in 1993. She led Team Ontario to the Gold Medal and was selected as the Most Valuable Player. Kellar played with the Beatrice Aeros in 1998 and participated in the championship game of the Esso Nationals, netting an assist.

She played for the Brown Bears women's ice hockey program at Brown University in Providence, Rhode Island from 1993–1997 and has an MBA from Wilfrid Laurier University. While at Brown, she played second base on the softball team. She was a First Team All-Ivy League selection at softball in 1995 and 1997. She was inducted into the Brown Athletics Hall of Fame in April 2005.

She later played for the Burlington Barracudas of the Canadian Women's Hockey League. In the 2007–08 and 2008–09 seasons, she was voted the CWHL Top Defender and a CWHL Central All-Star. On September 14, 2010, Hockey Canada announced that Kellar, along with three other players retired from international hockey.

Kellar is married and lives in Burlington, Ontario. She welcomed her first son, Owen, on October 22, 2004, and her second son, Zachary, on January 25, 2007.

Career stats

Hockey Canada

Awards and honours
 CWHL Top Defender, 2007–08 and 2008–09
 CWHL First All-Star Team, 2008–09
 CWHL Central All-Stars, 2007–08
 1996 ECAC All-Tournament team
 1996 ECAC Honor Roll

References

 Collins gem Hockey Facts and Stats 2009-10, p. 19, Andrew Podnieks, Harper Collins Publishers Ltd, Toronto, Canada, .

External links
 
 
 
 
 

1975 births
Brown Bears women's ice hockey players
Burlington Barracudas players
Canadian women's ice hockey defencemen
Ice hockey people from Ontario
Ice hockey players at the 1998 Winter Olympics
Ice hockey players at the 2002 Winter Olympics
Ice hockey players at the 2006 Winter Olympics
Ice hockey players at the 2010 Winter Olympics
Living people
Medalists at the 1998 Winter Olympics
Medalists at the 2002 Winter Olympics
Medalists at the 2006 Winter Olympics
Medalists at the 2010 Winter Olympics
Olympic gold medalists for Canada
Olympic ice hockey players of Canada
Olympic medalists in ice hockey
Olympic silver medalists for Canada
Sportspeople from Haldimand County
Wilfrid Laurier Golden Hawks ice hockey players